Kill for Love is the fourth studio album by American electronic music band Chromatics. It was released on March 26, 2012, by Italians Do It Better. On May 7, 2012, a drumless version of the album, containing 11 songs with no percussion, was made available by the band for free download.

Critical reception

Kill for Love received generally positive reviews from music critics. At Metacritic, which assigns a normalized rating out of 100 to reviews from mainstream publications, the album received an average score of 80, based on 18 reviews. AllMusic critic K. Ross Hoffman wrote that the album "maintains an impressively high level of quality and emotional resonance throughout", adding that "just about everything" on the album is "inarguably effective, and starkly beautiful in its simplicity". Drowned in Sounds Sean Adams praised its "scale and ambition" and dubbed it "a modern masterpiece", while BBC Music's Alex Denney named it "one of the finest records to surface this year". Jesse Cataldo of Slant Magazine viewed Kill for Love as "a great tribute to the grueling power of fatigue, an album that turns a dearth of ideas into a virtue."

Marc Hogan of Pitchfork commented that the album "boasts some of the most engrossing synth-pop songs so far this year", adding that "[i]t's not just a collection of hits; it's an album, one that gives the project's familiar nocturnal foreboding a new sense of grandeur." Austin Trunick of Under the Radar noted its "meticulously well thought-out" sequencing and remarked that it "feels less like an album and more like a feature film." Nows Benjamin Boles called the album "strikingly epic" and concluded that "as a more condensed pop album it could also be a strong statement, but the languid pacing and excess of empty space make the perfect frame for the singalongs." In a mixed review, Eric Harvey of The A.V. Club dubbed Kill for Love an "ambitious work", but felt that "the tracks blend together into a flat, echo-drenched concoction of Radelet's blank Nico croon", concluding that "it's probably worth just waiting for the movie [Drive]."

Accolades

Track listing

Charts

References

2012 albums
Chromatics (band) albums